The Angiriai Reservoir is an artificial lake in Kėdainiai District Municipality, central Lithuania. It was created in 1980, when a dam on the Šušvė river had been built next to Angiriai village. In 2000, the dam was reconstructed and a small hydroelectric plant has been built.
 
Shores of the reservoir at some places are high. The Pilsupiai Outcrop opens to the reservoir in Pilsupiai village. At the higher part of the Angiriai Reservoir the Skinderiškis Dendrological Park is located.

References

Lakes of Kėdainiai District Municipality
Reservoirs in Lithuania